The women's individual pursuit class C5 track cycling event at the 2020 Summer Paralympics will be taking place on 25 August 2021 at the Izu Velodrome, Japan. This class is for the cyclist who has impairments that affect their legs, arms, and/or trunk; they are still able to use a standard bicycle. 9 cyclists from 8 nations are competing in this event.

Competition format
The competition begins off with the qualifying round: all 9 cyclists are divided into 5 heats, each heat containing 2 cyclists except heat 1 only containing 1 cyclist. They will compete on a time trial basis. The 2 fastest in the qualifying round would qualify to the gold medal final while the 3rd and 4th fastest will qualify to the bronze medal final. The distance of this event is 3000m. The events' finals are held on the same day as the qualifying round.

Schedule

Records

Results

Qualifying

Finals

References

Women's pursuit C5